The 2000 Kentucky Derby took place at Churchill Downs in Louisville, Kentucky. The winner of the race was Fusaichi Pegasus with a finishing time of 2:01.02. 
The 2000 Kentucky Derby was the 126th running of the Kentucky Derby. The race took place on May 6, 2000. There were 153,204 in attendance. The winning horse Fusaichi Pegasus was the first betting favorite to win the Derby since Spectacular Bid in 1979. This was the last Kentucky Derby race to be broadcast on ABC, ending a 25-year association with the network; NBC took over the broadcast rights the next year and has broadcast the race since then.

History of Kentucky Derby 
The Kentucky Derby was started by Meriweather Lewis Clark, nephew of John and Henry Churchill, in Louisville, Kentucky. Meriweather Lewis Clark started a jockey club that raised money to build the track land that was donated by his uncles. Construction began in 1874 and the first race was in 1875, on May 17. His idea came from traveling in Europe and being inspired by the top racing places. Since the Derby is the biggest day in Kentuckys history, a tradition that has been made since 1921 is 'My Old Kentucky Home' is played when the horses walk to the gates for the race. Another tradition is the mint julep that has been around for at least a century originated in the south; this drink is made of bourbon, sugar, mint, and crushed ice.

Importance of the Kentucky Derby 
The Kentucky Derby is seen by Kentuckians "as important as Christmas" this day unites the state of Kentucky. Whether Kentuckians are at the Derby at Churchill Downs or watching from their living room nearly the whole state watches in unison "The Most Exciting Two Minutes in Sports". The race is not just important in Kentucky or the United States, its popularity is seen around the globe. People and horses from around the world flock to Churchill Downs in Louisville, Kentucky on the first Saturday in April to watch the short race. Those who attend the Derby can be seen dressed casually drinking, the official drink of the derby, a mint julep as they watch the races leading up to the main post. The Kentucky Derby brings together people from all over the globe and is by far the biggest sporting event of the year for Kentucky. Colonel Matt Winn was a part of a management team that took over Churchill downs in 1902. He was responsible for the promotion of the derby and made it from just a local event to the most iconic American horse race.

Background 
Fusaichi Pegasus is known fondly as “the most expensive racehorse of all time.” Fusaichi Pegasus was born to mare Angel Fever, who was purchased from Bob McNair and Arthur Hancock’s Stone Farm for $525,000. Fusaichi Pegasus was sold at the 1998 Keeneland July yearling sale to a Japanese businessman, Fusao Sekiguchi, who purchased the yearling at $4 million--the most expensive sale in 13 years. Fusaichi Pegasus was named after the last four letters, “ichi” which means “best” and “Pegasus'', which refers to the winged mythical creature.  After Fusaichi Pegasus' winning debut at the Kentucky Derby on May 6, 2000, Fusaichi was sold by Sekiguchi for a record of $70 million. This record-selling horse went to Coolmore Stud in Ireland, and he's held the title of "the most expensive horse in history" all the way through to his retirement of stud duties at Coolmore Stud in Kentucky during 2020.

Fusaichi Pegasus 

Fusaichi Pegasus was the name of the horse who won the 2000 Kentucky Derby and was ridden by jockey Kent Desormeaux. A large price was paid for Pegasus at Keeneland, by a buyer by the name of Fusao Sekiguchi, $4 million was how much was paid for Pegasus. His Buyer, Fusao Sekiguchi claimed "I had to have him. I had no limits on how much I would spend." Fusichi was chosen to be this horses name because it is a mix of the owners name "Fusao" combined with the Japanese word "ichi" which translates to "number one." Fusichi Pegasus won the 2000 Kentucky Derby by an entire one and a half lengths and finished with a time of 2:01 which was the sixth fastest finishing time thought the one hundred and twenty six years of derby's. This made Pegasus the 9th fastest Kentucky Derby winner ever.

Winning Prize and Training 
The horses are worth millions, the purse will be split between the top 5 finishers. The first-place winner receives around $1.86 million which is more than 60% of the total purse. This money that is won goes towards training, supplies, and some most is pocketed. The jockey receives 10% of the winning money, but that is budgeted by his agent and the valet that helps him prepare for the race. Some of the $186,000 that the jockey gets also goes towards taxes.

Training that goes into the horse occurs every day. The training happens in the morning and warms up with a jog that is about 1/8 of a mile, then the next half mile is a gallop. Next the horse gets to a good speed and then slows back down to a slow gallop and finishes with a jog. One month before, the workouts are extended and timed with a stopwatch. The jockey rides the horse prior to the race so they can build a relationship and the jockey can sense how the horse rides. The jockey also usually exercises the other horses the owner has, if he/she does.

Cost 
Owning a race horse is very expensive, there is a good amount of up keep the horse needs. The horse by itself can range from $2k to $380,000, some can go for over a million depending on the type of horse it is. The derby has an entrance fee of $25,000 and a starting fee of another $25,000. Vet bills are around $300-$1500 per month. Jockey fees are over $10k, a blacksmith is around $80-$100 every month, dentist is $75 every month, and chiropractors are around $75 every month. The other thing is trainers charge a day rate around $100, this contains employees, payroll taxes, workers comp, feeding and bedding, vitamins and supplies.

Keeneland 
Keeneland is located in Lexington, Kentucky, about six miles west of The University of Kentucky. Keeneland is a through bread auction house and race track. Where horse racing is hosted annually every fall and spring. Buyers can see horses race at the Keenland race track, then later purchase them at the auction house. From then buyers would assemble a horse racing team with a jockey and trainers and race their horse, in hopes that the horse will eventually make it to the national stage of the Kentucky Derby. Twenty-two winners of the Kentucky Derby were purchased at Keeneland, Fusaichi Pegasus being one of them.

Payout
The 126th Kentucky Derby Payout Schedule

 $2 Exacta: (12-5)  Paid   $66.00
 $2 Trifecta: (12-5-1c)  Paid   $435.00
 $1 Superfecta: (12-5-1c-9)  Paid   $1,635.40

Full results

Race Description 
Fusaichi Pegasus broke to the inside left of the field at the start of the race, saving ground along the backstretch. Trippi takes early lead, with Hal’s Hope challenging early on. Aptitude won along the backstretch, easing outside Fusaichi Pegasus nearing the final sixteenth. When rounding the clubhouse turn, Hal's Hope is in the front, following Trippi on the outside in second place. At the 1/2 mile mark, Fusaichi Pegasus finds room in the back towards the inside, having a lot of ground to make up, being eight links from the front. On the far turn, Hal's Hope is continuing to lead the way on the inside. By the 3/4 mile mark, Hal's Hope and Trippi are neck and neck of one another. We then see in the middle of the track that Captain Steve and Wheelaway have made advancing movements, and can see Fusaichi Pegasus in fifth place. Wheelaway takes lead by a head, with More Than Ready following in line. Fusaichi Pegasus comes flying on the outside, passing and taking the lead. Fusaichi Pegasus wins the Kentucky Derby by a leg and a half, with Aptitude following just behind.

See also
2000 Preakness Stakes
2000 Belmont Stakes

References

2000
Kentucky Derby
Derby
May 2000 sports events in the United States